The Three-child policy, whereby a couple can have three children, was a family planning policy in the People's Republic of China. The policy was announced on 31 May 2021 at a meeting of the Politburo of the Chinese Communist Party (CCP), chaired by CCP General Secretary, Xi Jinping, on population aging.

The announcement came after the release of the results of the Seventh National Population Census, which showed that the number of births in mainland China in 2020 was only 12 million, the lowest number of births since 1960, and the further aging of the population, against which the policy was born. This was the slowest population growth rate China experienced. The state-owned Chinese news agency, Xinhua, stated that this policy would be accompanied by supportive measures to maintain China's advantage in human labor. However, some Chinese citizens expressed dissatisfaction with the policy, as they would be unable to raise children due to the high cost of living in China.

The policy was adopted by the Central Committee of the Chinese Communist Party and State Council of the People's Republic of China in June 2021 and announced in July. In August the Standing Committee of the National People's Congress amended the family planning law cancelling restrictive measures including fines for couples having more children than permitted.

Background 

Beginning in 1979, China implemented the one-child policy, which stipulated that a couple could only have one child, resulting in a declining new population and a rapidly aging society. In order to slow down the trend of population aging, in 2015, the CCP officially launched the two-child policy, which relaxed the birth restrictions. However, the policy did not result in the expected wave of births, and the pregnancy rate among young women continued to show a record low decline, experiencing a third consecutive year of decrease. In this regard, during the 2020 National People's Congress (NPC) session, NPC deputy Huang Xihua suggested removing the penalty policy for having more than three children. Previously, the fine, called a "social upbringing fee" or "social maintenance fee", was the punishment for the families having more than one child. According to the policy, the families violating the law brought the burden to the whole society. Therefore, the social maintenance fee was used for the operation of local governments.

Reactions 
A January 2022 study suggested allowing a third child would not significantly boost fertility in the short term.

In January 2023, the government of Sichuan Province announced that it had abolished the three-child policy completely. Therefore, parents in Sichuan can now legally have as many children as they want. This was implemented to promote fertility in Sichuan.

See also 

 One-child policy
 Population history of China
 Tax on childlessness
 Two-child policy

References

2021 introductions
2021 establishments in China
Birth control law and case law
Demographics of China
Human overpopulation
One-child policy
Population ecology